Minor is a census-designated place (CDP) in Jefferson County, Alabama, United States. It is located north of the Birmingham suburb, Pleasant Grove and has a population of 1,094 (2010 census). Minor was damaged by an F5 tornado on April 8, 1998, including damage inflicted on the non-denominational Open Door Church.

Demographics

2000 Census 

According to the 2000 census, the population numbered 1,116 people, 456 households, and 340 families. The racial makeup of the CDP was 97.67% White, 0.90% Black or African American, 0.72% Native American, 0.09% Asian, and 0.63% from two or more races. 0.36% of the population were Hispanic or Latino of any race.

Out of the 456 households, 6.1% had children under the age of 18 living with them, 65.1% were married couples living together, 7.9% had a female householder with no husband present, and 25.4% were non-families. 23.0% of all households were made up of individuals, and 13.6% had someone living alone who was 65 years of age or older. The average household size was 2.45 and the average family size was 2.87.

The population was spread out, with 20.7% under the age of 18, 9.3% from 18 to 24, 26.2% from 25 to 44, 21.4% from 45 to 64, and 22.4% who were 65 years of age or older. The median age was 40 years. For every 100 females, there were 92.4 males. For every 100 females age 18 and over, there were 91.1 males.

The median household income was $33,710, and the median income for a family was $38,250. Males had a median income of $28,295 versus $24,042 for females. The per capita income was $14,690. About 2.0% of families and 1.6% of the population were below the poverty line, including none of those under age 18 and 8.2% of those age 65 or over.

2010 census
As of the 2010 census, there were 1,094 people, 405 households, and 294 families residing in the CDP. The racial makeup of the CDP was 77.6% White, 20.9% Black or African American, 0.3% Native American, 0.0% Asian, and 0.5% from two or more races. 1.5% of the population were Hispanic or Latino of any race.

27.2% of households had children under the age of 18 living with them, 52.8% were married couples living together, 14.3% had a female householder with no husband present, and 27.4% were non-families. 23.0% of all households were made up of individuals, and 10.6% had someone living alone who was 65 years of age or older. The average household size was 2.70 and the average family size was 3.13.

23.1% were under age 18, 6.9% were from 18 to 24, 27.6% from 25 to 44, 25.4% from 45 to 64, and 16.9% 65 or older. The median age was 39.8. For every 100 females, there were 95.4 males. For every 100 females age 18 and over, there were 106.3 males.

Median household income was $49,583, while median family income was $57,955. Males had a median income of $38,438 versus $27,011 for females. Per capita income was $24,406. About 16.0% of families and 18.3% of the population were below the poverty line, including 18.3% of those under age 18 and 0% of those age 65 or over.

2020 census

As of the 2020 United States census, there were 1,088 people, 315 households, and 233 families residing in the CDP.

History
In 1922, a new high school was named for retired Jefferson County school superintendent, John W. Minor. Thus the community area became known as Minor. The land for the school was donated by the Young family. The location was at the center of the coal communities of Bayview, Brookside, Docena, Edgewater and Mulga and other and later communities (Adamsville, Alden, Coalburg, Crumly Chapel, Forestdale, Fieldstown, Graysville, Hillview, Maytown, McDonald Chapel, Midway, Mineral Springs, Republic, Sandusky and Sylvan Springs). The school burned down in 1926 and rebuilt and reopened in 1928.

W. C. Petty was named principal in 1922 and served through May 1958. The building served as the high school through May 1988 when a new high school was built in Adamsville. In the 1960s, Minor Christian School was established on McDonald Chapel Road.

Economy 
Over the years, a few businesses were established:

 Minor Grocery (owner Grace Houk)
 Powell/Motley Grocery
 Top Hat Inn, a night club
 Donaldson Filling Station
 Minor Ice Cream Bar, started by the Blevins family and later operated by Tommy and Jones Pender, the Marshman's, the Alexander's and Mr. and Mrs. Floyd
 Anthony/Gardner/Lucas Bus Lines
 Lindley Plumbing & Heating Co. (1960 to 2001)
 Stowe Florist
 Reach's Hair Salon
 Pit Stop gas station
 Jones Florist
 Rankin's TV Repair and Stouts Watch Repair

At the fork of Mulga Loop Road and Docena Road (later changed to Minor Parkway) stood Pete's and Bud's Bar-B-que and later a Shell service station. Frank Baker built a service station across the road that was demolished to build a highway. Tillman's service station was up the road toward Ensley and later became Plunkett's Bar-B-Que.  Still later, Charlie's (a nightclub) was built near Docena Road and Birmingport. A small stripmall was built on Birmingport Road by the Echert's. It had a Shell service station, a restaurant and a convenience store. Later, all but the gas station portion burned down.

By 2017, only the Pit Stop was in business.

Churches 

 Minor First Baptist
 Minor United Methodist, on land donated by the Young family
 Westmont Baptist
 Minor church of Christ
 Open Door, located on Birmingport Road and later partially operating out of the old Minor Christian School and later the old Methodist Church location
 Minor church of God (formerly Docena church of God)

References

Census-designated places in Jefferson County, Alabama
Census-designated places in Alabama
Birmingham metropolitan area, Alabama